Talaram or Telaram may refer to:
 Telaram, Mahmudabad
 Talaram, Sari